Ta'Rhonda Jones (born July 12, 1988) is an American actress and rapper who is best known for her recurring role as Porsha Taylor on the FOX television series Empire and was promoted to the main cast for the second season. Jones portrays Taraji P. Henson's assistant on the drama.

Career
Jones originally tried out for the role of Tiana Brown, portrayed by Serayah McNeill. Before getting the role on Empire, she worked at a nursing home in South Side Chicago. She also had a role in an episode of Chicago P.D. entitled "Get Back to Even" in 2015.

In 2016, she played the role of Sister in the short film The Tale of Four directed by Gabourey Sidibe.

In 2017, Jones played the role of Meg in the Hallmark movie The Perfect Christmas Present.

In 2020, Jones played the role of Shanara Mobley in the Lifetime movie, "Stolen By My Mother: The Kamiyah Mobley Story."

Filmography

Television

Film

References

External links 
 

Living people
American television actresses
African-American actresses
American women rappers
African-American women rappers
Actresses from Chicago
Rappers from Chicago
1988 births
21st-century American rappers
21st-century American women musicians
21st-century African-American women
21st-century African-American musicians
20th-century African-American people
20th-century African-American women
21st-century women rappers